HD 207832 is a G-type main-sequence star. Its surface temperature is 5764 K. HD 207832 is slightly enriched compared to the Sun in its concentration of heavy elements, with a metallicity Fe/H index of 0.17 and is much younger at an age of 0.74 billion years. Kinematically, it belongs to the thin disk of the Milky Way.

A multiplicity study in 2014 detected a candidate comoving stellar companion - a red dwarf star or brown dwarf with a spectral class M6.5, at a very wide projected separation of 38.57′ (2.0 light years)

Planetary system
In 2012, two planets, named HD 207832b and HD 207832c, were discovered by the radial velocity method on wide, eccentric orbits. The planetary system would remain stable even if the planetary orbits are coplanar.

Although discovery of the inner planet was confirmed in 2018, the discovery of both planets was suspected to be a false positive in 2020, as newer radial velocity data do not support the existence of the planets.

References

Piscis Austrinus
G-type main-sequence stars
Hypothetical planetary systems
J21523626-2601352
107985
207832
CD-26 15858